Armone is a surname. Notable people with the surname include:

 Joseph Armone (1917–1992), American mobster, brother of Stephen
 Stephen Armone (1899–1960), American mobster

See also
 Armon (disambiguation)
 Arnone

Italian-language surnames